Tray Blackmon (born October 20, 1985) is an American former professional football player who was a linebacker. He played college football for the Auburn Tigers.

Early years
Although undersized for a typical national type linebacker recruit, Blackmon was considered a five-star prospect by several recruiting services. Scout.com ranked him #1 among the 2005 linebackers class. The Player of the Year in AAA for the State Champion Grangers, Blackmon had 116 tackles, 16 tackles for loss, 12 Sacks, 5 forced fumbles, 3 fumble recoveries, one safety, and one defensive touchdown as a senior.

College career
After redshirting in 2005, Blackmon recorded 18 tackles, including 2.5 for loss, in six games in 2006, which earned him a spot on The Sporting News Freshman All-America Second Team. He amassed 41 tackles, including 25 solo, in last seven games of the 2007 season. He added 21 tackles in 2008 and has 84 tackles for his career.

Blackmon battled suspensions and injuries during his collegiate career.  Blackmon was suspended from playing in Auburn's first three games of the 2006 season. In 2008, Blackmon suffered a broken bone in his wrist in the fourth game of the season.

Professional career
On May 5, 2009, he signed with the Calgary Stampeders of the Canadian Football League.

References

Further reading

External links
Calgary Stampeders bio

1985 births
Living people
Auburn Tigers football players
American football linebackers
Canadian football linebackers
American players of Canadian football
Calgary Stampeders players
Louisiana Swashbucklers players
People from LaGrange, Georgia